The Iași Exhibition Park is a park located in the Copou Hill neighborhood, Iași, Romania.

History
Opened in 1923, the park was designed by the architect Nicolae Ghica-Budești and covers an area of 5.4 hectares.

See also
Botanical Garden of Iași
Seven hills of Iași

References

External links

Parks in Iași
1923 establishments in Romania